Basari may refer to:

Basari, Iran (disambiguation)
Basari language (disambiguation)
Başarı, Çermik
Başarı, Kemaliye